Lamas Aqueduct is a Roman aqueduct in Mersin Province, Turkey

Location 
It is directed to south west in parallel to Mediterranean coast. The original aqueduct ends by the ancient Elaiussa Sebaste (modern Ayaş), but a supplementary aqueduct reaches to Corycus (modern Kızkalesi).

History 
The first part of the watercourse up to Elaiussa Sebaste was constructed by Roman Empire in the 1st or 2nd centuries. But after Elaleussia Sebaste lost its former glory, the second part up to Corykos was constructed by Byzantine Empire in the 5th or 6th centuries.

Construction 
Part of the watercourse is through open channels or galleries in the peneplane area south of Toros Mountains. The galleries have windows for maintenance. But most of the watercourse is actually a series of seven aqueducts over the fields and the roads . To ensure a stable flow in the aqueduct the aqueduct has a constant slope between Limonlu River and Corykus.

See also 
List of aqueducts in the Roman Empire
List of Roman aqueducts by date
Ancient Roman technology
Roman engineering

References 

Roman sites in Turkey
Archaeological sites in Mersin Province, Turkey
Olba territorium